José Pedro Pozzi, S.D.B. (12 July 1925 – 26 November 2017) was a Brazilian Catholic prelate.

Born in Vimercate, Italy, as Giuseppe Pietro Pozzi, he joined the Salesians and was ordained to the priesthood in 1951. He served as the Bishop of Alto Valle del Río Negro from 1993 until he retired in 2003. He died on 26 November 2017 in General Roca, Río Negro, at the age of 92.

References

External links
 Bishop José Pedro Pozzi at Catholic-Hierarchy.org 

1925 births
2017 deaths
People from Vimercate
Salesian bishops
20th-century Roman Catholic bishops in Brazil
21st-century Roman Catholic bishops in Brazil
Roman Catholic bishops of Alto Valle del Río Negro